"Io canto" is a song written by Riccardo Cocciante and Marco Luberti. Originally released in 1979 by Cocciante as the title single for his album …E io canto, the song became a hit in Italy and during the following years, it became an Italian standard.

In 2006, the song received new attention, following the release of a cover recorded by Italian singer Laura Pausini. Her version of the song was chosen as the first single from her album Io canto and charted across Europe, also reaching the top spot on the Italian Singles Chart.

Riccardo Cocciante version
The original version of the song was recorded by Italian singer Riccardo Cocciante and released in January 1979 as a single from his studio album …E io canto, released during the same year.
Cocciante, composer of the music, also arranged the song, while lyricist Marco Luberti was also credited as its producer.

A French-language version of the song, titled "Je chante" was released by Cocciante himself. He also recorded a Spanish-language version of the song, under the name "Yo canto", while an English-language adaptation of "Io canto", written in 1979 and titled "I'm singing", was released for the first time in 2009 only, as a track of Cocciante's album Fable.

The song was also included in Cocciante's compilation album Tutti i miei sogni, released in 2006.

Track listing
 7" single
 "Io canto" – 4:25
 "Il treno" – 4:27

Charts

Laura Pausini version

In 2006, Italian singer Laura Pausini recorded a cover of the song, including it in her album with the same title, entirely composed of covers of popular Italian songs, and released it as the lead single from the set. In January 2011, a poll conducted by the website Rockol.it declared Pausini's version of the song the best Italian cover of the decade.

In 2013, Pausini re-recorded the song as a duet with Belgian singer Lara Fabian, in an Italian-French version, for Pausini's second compilation album 20 - The Greatest Hits. It's included only in the Italian version of the album. The Spanish edition, instead, includes "Dispárame, dispara".

The music video for the song was directed by Gaetano Morbioli. The singles has sold 70,000 downloads in Italy.

Track listing
 Io canto – CD single
 "Io canto"
 "Yo canto"
 "Io canto" (Instrumental)

 Je chante – CD single
 "Io canto" – 4:18
 "Je chante (Io canto)" – 4:22

 Io canto – digital download
 "Io canto" (Radio Edit) – 4:23

 Yo canto – digital download
 "Yo canto" (Radio Edit) – 4:16

 Je chante – digital download
 "Je chante (Io canto)" – 4:23

Personnel
Music credits
 Luca Bignardi – programming
 Vinnie Colaiuta – drums
 Tony Franklin – bass guitar
 Greg Howe – electric guitar
 Michael Landau – electric guitar, acoustic guitar
 Laura Pausini – vocals, background vocals
 Antonella Pepe – background vocals
 Tim Pierce – electric guitar, acoutstic guitar
 Giorgio Secco – acoustic guitar
 Celso Valli – piano, keyboards, background vocals, arrangements

Production credits
 Celso Valli – producer
 Luca Bignardi – engineer, mixing
 Marco Borsatti – additional engineer
 Clark Germaine – engineer
 Tom Syrowsky – assistant
 Matt Serrecchio – assistant
 Nicola Fantozzi – assistant

Charts

Italian-language version

Spanish-language version

Release history

References

1979 singles
2006 singles
Laura Pausini songs
Number-one singles in Italy
Italian-language songs
Spanish-language songs
French-language songs
English-language Italian songs
1979 songs
Songs written by Riccardo Cocciante
RCA Records singles
Riccardo Cocciante songs
Songs written by Marco Luberti